Hoseynabad (also Romanized as Ḩoseynābād; also known as Husainābād) is a village in Hoseynabad Rural District, Mehrdasht District, Najafabad County, Isfahan Province, Iran. At the 2006 census, its population was 2,862, in 720 families.

References 

Populated places in Najafabad County